S. heterophylla  may refer to:
 Schinopsis heterophylla, a South American tree species
 Stylomecon heterophylla, the wind poppy, a flowering plant species native to California and north western Mexico